James Tucker may refer to:

Politics 
Jim Tucker (Louisiana politician) (born 1964), Speaker of the Louisiana House
Jim Guy Tucker (born 1943), former Governor of Arkansas
James Tucker (Canadian politician) (1857–1918), Ontario
James N. Tucker Jr. (born 1934), New Brunswick politician
James Roy Tucker (1909–1987), member of Canadian Parliament from Newfoundland

Creative arts 
Jim Tucker (guitarist) (born 1946), member of The Turtles
James Tucker (born 1929), Welsh novelist who wrote under the pseudonym Bill James
James Tucker (convict) (1808–1888), early Australian author
James D. M. Tucker (born 1998), New Zealand musician and producer

Others 
Jim Tucker (basketball) (born 1932), basketball player
James Neil Tucker (1957–2004), murderer
Jim Tucker (journalist) (1934–2013), American journalist
Jim B. Tucker, psychiatrist and reincarnation researcher
James Tucker (rugby union) (born 1994), New Zealand rugby union player
James Tucker, co-pilot on FedEx Flight 705

See also 
Jim Tucker (disambiguation)